Sahlulele Luzipo is a South African politician who was elected to the National Assembly of South Africa in the 2014 general election as a member of the African National Congress. He was then elected to chair the Portfolio Committee on  Mineral Resources. Following his re-election in 2019, Luzipo was elected chair of the newly established Portfolio Committee on Mineral Resources and Energy.

References

External links
Profile at Parliament of South Africa

Living people
Place of birth missing (living people)
Zulu people
African National Congress politicians
Members of the National Assembly of South Africa
South African Communist Party politicians
Year of birth missing (living people)